Ichiro Kawachi is a social epidemiologist of Japanese origin who was trained in New Zealand. He is currently the John L. Loeb and Frances Lehman Loeb Professor of Social Epidemiology at the Harvard T.H. Chan School of Public Health where he is also the chair of the Department of Social and Behavioral Sciences. 

Along with S.V. Subramanian, he is the co-editor-in-chief of the international journal Social Science & Medicine  and the sister open access journal SSM – Population Health. In 2018, Kawachi was elected an Honorary Fellow of the Royal Society of New Zealand. He is also an elected member of the Institute of Medicine of the US National Academy of Sciences.

Kawachi attended Otago Boy's High School, and gained his medical degree and Ph.D. in epidemiology from the University of Otago, New Zealand. He has taught at Harvard since 1992.

Publications 

 Income Inequality and Health: A Reader. New York: The New Press. 1999. 
 Is Inequality Bad for Our Health? Boston: Beacon Press. 2000. 
 Social Epidemiology. New York: Oxford University Press. 2000. 
 The Health of Nations. New York: The New Press, 2002. 
 Neighborhoods and Health New York: Oxford University Press. 2003. 
 Globalization and Health. New York: Oxford University Press. 2006. 
 Social Capital and Health. New York: Springer. 2008. 
Behavioral Economics and Public Health, edited with Christina Roberto: Oxford University Press. 2016. 
Social Epidemiology of Sleep, edited with Dustin Duncan & Susan Redline, Oxford University Press. 2019. 
The Oxford Handbook of Public Health Practice, edited with Iain Lang, and Walter Ricciardi. Oxford University Press. 4th edition. 2020.

References

Year of birth missing (living people)
Living people
Harvard School of Public Health faculty
Medical journal editors
Fellows of the Royal Society of New Zealand
American people of Japanese descent
American sociologists
American epidemiologists
University of Otago alumni